was a Japanese politician.

Biography
Kosaka was born in the city of Nagano in Nagano Prefecture, on 12 March 1946. His father is Zentaro Kosaka, also a politician. Kenji Kosaka received a law degree from Keio University in 1968.

He worked in London for Japan Airlines between 1968 and 1984. Returning to Japan, he became secretary to Prime Minister Yasuhiro Nakasone in 1986. He was appointed minister of education on 31 October 2005. In 2005, he was elected to the House of Representatives for the sixth time, representing Nagano Prefecture.

Kenji Kosaka is affiliated to the openly revisionist lobby Nippon Kaigi. He died on 21 October 2016 of cancer.

References

External links
 Official website

1946 births
2016 deaths
People from Nagano (city)
Keio University alumni
Members of Nippon Kaigi
Education ministers of Japan
Members of the House of Representatives (Japan)
21st-century Japanese politicians
Deaths from cancer in Japan
Culture ministers of Japan
Sports ministers of Japan
Technology ministers of Japan
Science ministers of Japan